Uniontown Historic District may refer to:
Uniontown Historic District (Uniontown, Alabama)
Uniontown Historic District (Uniontown, Maryland)